Otoniel Quintana (23 August 1946 – 18 March 2018) was a Colombian footballer. He competed in the men's tournament at the 1968 Summer Olympics.

References

External links
 
 

1946 births
2018 deaths
Colombian footballers
Colombia international footballers
Olympic footballers of Colombia
Footballers at the 1968 Summer Olympics
People from Popayán
Association football goalkeepers
Millonarios F.C. players
Atlético Nacional footballers
Once Caldas footballers
Sportspeople from Cauca Department
Deportes Tolima managers
Millonarios F.C. managers